Paolo Perrone (born 16 December 1967 in Lecce) is an Italian politician.

He ran with Forza Italia for the office of Mayor of Lecce at the 2007 mayoral elections, supported by a centre-right coalition. He was elected on 27 May 2007 and took office on 29 May. Perrone was elected for a second term at the 2012 elections.

In 2018 he joined the right-wing party Brothers of Italy.

See also
List of mayors of Lecce

References

External links
 

1967 births
Living people
Mayors of Lecce